The General Office of the Central Committee of the Chinese Communist Party, often referred to as the Central Office, is an office directly under the Central Committee of the Chinese Communist Party in charge of providing support for the Central Committee and its Politburo, including codifying intra-party regulations, conducting policy research and providing administrative support. The Director of the General Office currently serves as the First Secretary of the Secretariat of the Chinese Communist Party.

The office is responsible for drafting and circulating party directives and internal memos, as well as the classification of party information. It is in charge of arranging logistics for major meetings of the Central Committee and its Politburo. It is responsible for preparing meeting agendas, recording and filing meeting minutes, and distribution of communications to meeting stakeholders.

Although its business is often not overtly political, its Directors have historically had close connections with the Party's top leaders, and usually join the Politburo or the Secretariat after their period leading the General Office. The Director of the General office has been informally referred to as the "Danei Zongguan", roughly translated as "the gatekeeper". While the Director of the General Office is sometimes referred to as an analogue to the party General Secretary's "Chief of Staff", the General Secretary also maintains a personal staff as part of the Office of the General Secretary, whose director may also, but not necessarily, conterminously hold the position of Director of the General Office.

History 
The General Office's establishment date is uncertain, though it existed by 1942 as Li Fuchun was its chief at that time; previously, its functions were exercised by the Organization Department or technical secretariats.

List of directors 
 Director of the General Office of the Central Secretariat
 Li Fuchun (1942–1945)
 Yang Shangkun (1945–1948)

 Director of the General Office of the Central Committee
 Yang Shangkun (1948–1965)
 Wang Dongxing (1965–1978)
 Yao Yilin (1978–1982)
 Hu Qili (1982–1983)
 Qiao Shi (1983–1984)
 Wang Zhaoguo (1984–1986)
 Wen Jiabao (1986–1993)
 Zeng Qinghong (1993–1999)
 Wang Gang (1999–2007)
 Ling Jihua (2007–2012)
 Li Zhanshu (2012–2017)
 Ding Xuexiang (2017–2023)
 Cai Qi (2023–)

Agencies directly under the General Office 
Research Office
Secretary Bureau
Bureau of Regulations
Security Bureau
Confidential Bureau
Confidential Transportation Bureau
Special Accounting Office
Supervision and Inspection Office
Personnel Bureau
Office of the General Secretary
 Administration Bureau of Organs directly under the Central Committee

See also 

 Politics of the People's Republic of China
 Secretariat of the Chinese Communist Party
 First Secretary of the Chinese Communist Party
 General Offices
 General Office of the State Council
 General Office of the Central Military Commission
 General Department of the Communist Party of the Soviet Union

References 

Institutions of the Central Committee of the Chinese Communist Party